Rajani is a 2009 Kannada-language romantic comedy film  directed by Thriller Manju and produced by Ramu for his banner Ramu Enterprises. The movie is a remake of 2008 Telugu film Krishna (2008). The film features Upendra and Aarti Chabria in the lead roles. The film's score and soundtrack is composed by Hamsalekha.

The film released across Karnataka on 18 September 2009 coinciding Upendra's birthday.

Plot
The film is about Rajani (Upendra), who was once a software engineer but quits his job to give it to his friend and now is unemployed in Mysore. Sandhya (Aarti Chabria) is a girl from Bangalore who studies in college and comes to Mysore for her vacation to stay with her elder brother Bobby (Rangayana Raghu) and his wife (Chitra Shenoy). Rajani falls in love with Sandhya at first sight and starts chasing her to win her heart and enters the upper portion of their house as tenants with his brother Chandrashekar (Ramesh Bhatt) and sister-in-law (Thulasi Shivamani). In this process, Rajani has a clash with local rowdy Lanka Raju (Dhandapani). Mistaking him to be one Tapori, Sandhya hates him first but later on realizes his true nature. She returns to Bangalore and lives with her older brother Sharath (Sharath Lohitashwa), a former builder and now a very powerful rowdy who is very possessive and protective about his sister. Rajani follows Sandhya to Bangalore and works his way into their house with Bobby's help, and finally, both of them confess their love. There, Rajani knows Sandhya's flashback and how she is being chased by the notorious and cruel Jakka (Mukul Dev), assisted by his uncle (Doddanna) for marriage. In the end, Sharath kills Jakka, and Rajani marries Sandhya.

Cast

 Upendra as Rajani
 Aarti Chabria as Sandhya
 Mukul Dev as Jakka
 Rangayana Raghu as Bobby
 Doddanna as Paandu
 Ramesh Bhat as MRO Chandrashekhar
 Sharath Lohitashwa as Sharath 
 Chitra Shenoy
 Thulasi Shivamani
 Sadhu Kokila as The person who lives in neighbouring Place of banglore
 Dhandapani as Lanka Raju
 Ramakrishna as The Government Officer who died in Jakka's Hands 
 Kuri Pratap
 Bullet Prakash
 Mandya Ramesh
 Sathyajith as Advocate Sushil Kumar 
 Killer Venkatesh

Soundtrack
The film's score and soundtrack is composed by Hamsalekha. The audio released under the Anand Audio label.

Reception

Critical response 

A critic from The New Indian Express wrote "The film is technically superior with good fights and song sequences. "Rajini" is a huge entertainer for Upendra fans. 'Rajini' a must-watch for Upendra fans". BS Srivani from  Deccan Herald wrote "Coming to music, it is refreshing to see that Hamsalekha has loosened up a bit. He blasts some ‘jhakaas’ music for the front-benchers while some sensitive listeners are bound to be amazed at the cheek of the lyrics in two songs (Thriller Manju aims to thrill, after all). This Rajani is one ‘fultoo’ entertainer". A critic from Bangalore Mirror wrote  "Stunt master turned director Thriller Manju finally manages to direct a film worth watching. After two dozen original films and a copied logo for his production house, Ramu reverses the trend here. He gets an original logo done and remakes the Telugu film Krishna. And for all those producers calling for austerity measures, this film has an answer. There is a song in which Upendra goes after Aarati asking her to follow him to Nandi Hills and Basavanagudi. The song has been shot abroad".

References

2009 films
Indian action comedy films
Kannada remakes of Telugu films
2009 action comedy films
2000s Kannada-language films
Films scored by Hamsalekha
2000s masala films